Westview Centennial Secondary School (Westview Centennial SS, WCSS, or Westview in short) is a semestered public high school in Toronto, Ontario, Canada. It has a student body of about 920 students located in Toronto, Ontario, Canada under the sanction of the Toronto District School Board. It is located in the University Heights neighbourhood of North York.

History
Westview Centennial was founded in 1967. The reason for Centennial being added to the school's name is that the school was built 100 years after Canada had claimed its independence from the United Kingdom.

Sport teams
 Basketball team 
 Volleyball team 
 Soccer team
 Track team
 Cross-Country team
 Ultimate Frisbee
 Swimming
 Wrestling
 Baseball Team
 Cricket Team
 Swim Team

Alumni
 Anderson, (Notifi) Matthew, Songwriter, Rapper, Producer, Artist
 Nora Fatehi, Bollywood dancer and actress
 Jason Allison, NHL player
 Carlos Newton, Mixed Martial Artist (Former UFC Welterweight Champion)
Chuckie Akenz, Former Rapper
Tiffany Ford, Toronto District School Board Trustee
Rita DeMontis, journalist and broadcaster
Sergio Trujillo, Broadway choreographer
Donovan "Razor" Ruddock, (born December 21, 1963) is a former professional boxer who competed from 1982 to 2001, and in 2015.

See also
List of high schools in Ontario

References

External links
Westview Centennial Secondary School
TDSB Profile
Westview Centennial Secondary School - The First Decade

High schools in Toronto
Schools in the TDSB
Educational institutions established in 1967
1967 establishments in Ontario